Waitākere is a locality name in West Auckland, New Zealand. It most commonly refers to:

Waitākere, Auckland, a rural town north-west of Auckland
Waitakere City, a former territorial authority which existed from 1989 to 2010
Waitākere Ranges, a mountain range in West Auckland

Waitākere may also refer to:

Waitakere City FC, a football club
Waitākere College, a school in Henderson, New Zealand
Waitakere (New Zealand electorate), a former parliamentary electorate
Waitakere railway station in Waitākere town
Waitākere Reservoir in the Waitākere Ranges
Waitākere River in the Waitākere Ranges
Waitākere volcano, a former volcano in the Miocene era
Waitākere ward, a district of Auckland Council